Hugh Campbell Murray (April 22, 1825 – September 18, 1857) was an American lawyer and the third Chief Justice of California.

Biography
Murray was born in St Louis, Missouri before his family moved to Alton, Illinois when he was a child. Little is known of his schooling except that he almost certainly studied Latin. In 1846 he began studying at the law firm of N.D. Strong in Alton. On March 8, 1847, following the outbreak of the Mexican–American War he was commissioned as a second lieutenant in the 14th Infantry Regiment. After the end of the war he resigned his commission on March 31, 1848, and returned to Alton to study.

After completing his studies he was called to the Bar and moved to California, where he gained a large circle of friends and a lucrative practice as a lawyer. On January 8, 1850, at the age of 24, he was elected a member of the San Francisco ayuntamiento (town council), and continued to work as a lawyer. On April 20, 1850, he was made a Judge of the San Francisco Superior Court. On October 11, 1851, at the age of 26, he was made an associate justice of the Supreme Court of California, the youngest ever appointed.

In March 1852, upon the resignation of Henry A. Lyons, he became Chief Justice at the age of 27, the youngest ever Chief Justice of California.  He was subsequently elected to another term as chief justice.  As Chief Justice, his annual salary in 1854 was US$8,000.

As Chief Justice, he was noted for his dislike of changing the law through his decisions and for his irascible temper. Having heard that a man had called him "the meanest Chief Justice ever," Murray found the man and beat him with his cane.  He was consequently fined by the city recorder of Sacramento the sum of $50 plus costs. Murray wrote the majority opinion of the court in People v. Hall, 4 Cal. 399 (1854), which Charles J. McClain describes as "containing some of the most offensive racial rhetoric to be found in the annals of California appellate jurisprudence."

On September 18, 1857, he died in office of consumption. He is interred in Sacramento Historic City Cemetery. In the October 1857 election, Stephen Johnson Field was elected to fill his seat.

Civic activities
He was a member of the Society of California Pioneers.

See also
 Alexander Wells
 Charles Henry Bryan
 Henry A. Lyons
 List of justices of the Supreme Court of California
 Solomon Heydenfeldt

References

Bibliography

External links
 Hugh C. Murray In Memoriam. 8 Cal. Rpts. iii (1857). California Supreme Court Historical Society. Retrieved July 18, 2017.
 Past & Present Justices. California State Courts. Retrieved July 19, 2017.

1825 births
1857 deaths
American military personnel of the Mexican–American War
19th-century deaths from tuberculosis
Chief Justices of California
Justices of the Supreme Court of California
Superior court judges in the United States
People from Alton, Illinois
Lawyers from San Francisco
Lawyers from St. Louis
United States Army officers
U.S. state supreme court judges admitted to the practice of law by reading law
19th-century American judges
Tuberculosis deaths in California
19th-century American lawyers
Military personnel from Illinois